Haim G. Ginott ( Ginzburg; August 5, 1922 – November 4, 1973) was a school teacher, a child psychologist and psychotherapist and a parent educator.  He pioneered techniques for conversing with children that are still taught today.  His book, Between Parent and Child, stayed on the best seller list for over a year and is still popular today. This book sets out to give "specific advice derived from basic communication principles that will guide parents in living with children in mutual respect and dignity."

Early life and education 
Ginott was born in 1922 in Tel Aviv, Israel. He had three brothers.  After emigrating to the United States he graduated from Columbia University's Teachers College in 1948, and then earned his master's degree in 1949. He then studied psychology at Columbia University, where he earned a doctorate in clinical psychology in 1952.

Career 
Ginott's career began as an elementary school teacher in Israel in 1947. He was "resident psychologist on NBC's "Today Show. He wrote a weekly syndicated newspaper column called "Between Us," and lectured in Europe, Israel and in the U.S. He was adjunct professor of psychology at the New York University Graduate School, and he was a clinical professor in Adelphi University's postdoctoral program in psychotherapy. He was a United Nations Educational, Scientific and Cultural Organization consultant to the Israeli ministry of education.

Communications approach 
Ginott's approach to child-rearing and education was one in which the parent/educator strives to understand the feelings and mind of the student/child using respectful language of compassion and understanding. He asserted that children learned how their parents/teachers felt about them by how they spoke to them. The following serve to illustrate Dr. Ginott's communications approach.
 Never deny or ignore a child's feelings.
 Only the behavior is treated as unacceptable, never the child.
 Depersonalize negative interactions by mentioning only the problem. "I see a messy room."
 Attach rules to things, e.g., "Little sisters are not for hitting."
 Dependence breeds hostility. Let children do for themselves what they can.
 Children need to learn to choose, but within the safety of limits. "Would you like to wear this blue shirt or this red one?"
 Limit criticism to a specific event—don't say "never", "always", as in: "You never listen," "You always manage to spill things", etc.
 Refrain from using words that you would not want the child to repeat.
 Ignore irrelevant behavior

Adele Faber and Elaine Mazlish were members of a parenting group run by Dr. Ginott, and state in an introduction that Dr. Ginott's classes were the inspiration for the books they wrote.

Quotes from Between Parent and Teenager 
 "Rebellion follows rejection."
 "Truth for its own sake can be a deadly weapon in family relations. Truth without compassion can destroy love. Some parents try too hard to prove exactly how, where and why they have been right. This approach will bring bitterness and disappointment. When attitudes are hostile, facts are unconvincing." (p. 38)

Quotes from Teacher and Child 

 "If you want your children to improve, let them overhear the nice things you say about them to others."

Personal life 
Ginott resided at 923 Fifth Avenue in New York City. He was survived by his widow, the former Dr. Alice Lasker, who was also a psychologist and co-author, with her husband, of "Between Husband and Wife." They had two daughters, Mimi and Mrs. Roz Frumess.

Death 
Ginott died at Beekman Downtown Hospital on November 4, 1973. He was buried in Israel at Kibbutz Sha'ar HaGolan in the Jordan Valley.

Bibliography
 Between Parent and Child (1965, Macmillan)
 Between Parent and Teenager (1967, Macmillan)
 Teacher and Child (1972, Macmillan)

See also
 How to Talk So Kids Will Listen & Listen So Kids Will Talk
 Siblings Without Rivalry: How to Help Your Children Live Together So You Can Live Too
 Adele Faber
 Elaine Mazlish

References

External links

 Video clips, bios, revised text of Between Parent and Teenager

1922 births
1973 deaths
American family and parenting writers
American people of Israeli descent
20th-century American psychologists
American psychotherapists
Child psychologists
Teachers College, Columbia University alumni
Jewish American writers